Semple is both a surname of Scottish origin, and a given name. Notable people with the name include:

People with the surname

In arts and media
 Dugald Semple (1884–1964), Scottish writer and simple living advocate
 George Semple (1700–1782), Irish architect
 Jack Semple (21st century), Canadian blues musician
 Keith Semple, Northern Ireland musician, member of British boyband One True Voice and American rock band 7th Heaven
 Lorenzo Semple Jr. (1923–2014), American screenwriter
 Pat Semple (1939–2021), British artist
 Robert B. Semple Jr. (born 1936), Pulitzer Prize-winning journalist
 Stuart Semple (born 1980), contemporary English artist

In government, military, and politics
 Bob Semple (1873–1955), member of the Cabinet of New Zealand
 Eugene Semple (1840–1908), thirteenth Governor of Washington Territory
 James Semple (1798–1866), United States Senator from Illinois
 Letitia Semple (1821–1907), United States society patron and unofficial First Lady
 Robert Semple (veteran) (1887–1943), United States Navy officer
 Robert B. Semple (1806–1854), California newspaperman and politician

In sport
 Billy Semple (born 1946), Scottish football player
 Carol Semple (born 1948), American golfer
 Frederick Semple (1872–1927), American golfer and tennis player
 Jock Semple (1903–1988), Boston Marathon official
 Keith Semple (born 1970), Guyanese cricketer
 Ryan Semple (English footballer) (born 1985), English football player
 Ryan Semple (Northern Irish footballer) (born 1977), Northern Irish football player
 Tom Semple (1879–1943), Irish sportsperson
 Tony Semple (born 1970), American football player

In science and academia
 David Semple (1856–1937), bacteriologist
 Ellen Churchill Semple (1863–1932), American geographer
 John C. Semple (born 1947), American botanist
 John Greenlees Semple, mathematician
 John W. Semple (born 1959), Canadian medical researcher
 William F. Semple, 19th–century American dentist

In other fields
 Etta Semple (1854–1914), American atheist and feminist
 Ian Semple (born 1928), member of the Universal House of Justice of the Bahá'í Faith
 Robert Semple (Canada) (1777–1816), Governor of the Hudson's Bay Company

People with the given name
 Aimee Semple McPherson (1890–1944), Canadian-born evangelist and media sensation
 Roberta Semple Salter (1910–2007), member of the International Church of the Foursquare Gospel

Fictional characters
 Jake Semple, a character from the book Surviving the Applewhites
Jesse B. Semple, a character featured in many stories by American writer Langston Hughes

Other meanings
 Semple Stadium, a sports stadium in Tipperary, Ireland 
 Castle Semple, a mansion in Renfrewshire, Scotland

See also
 Sempill (disambiguation)
 Sample (disambiguation)
 Semple-Marzetta
 Simple (disambiguation)

References

Surnames of Scottish origin